Supervivientes 2020: Perdidos en Honduras, is the fifteenth season of the show Supervivientes and the nineteenth season of Survivor to air in Spain and it will be broadcast on Telecinco in February 2020. Jorge Javier Vázquez will be the main host at the central studio in Madrid, with Lara Álvarez co-hosting from the island, Jordi Gonzalez hosting a side debate of the program and Carlos Sobera hosting a gala in Cuatro.

Due to the 2020 coronavirus outbreak in Spain, starting from 15 March, all live shows will air without the audience in the studio to respects the governmental procedures imposed.

Cast
The contestants are being announced daily by the network.

Nominations

Notes
: Hugo was exempt as he was the God of the week. He also chose the leaders of each tribe.
: As the leaders of the tribes, Antonio and Jorge were given the power to name a nominee.
: Cristian was exempt as he was the God of the week. He also chose the leader of the Servants tribe.
: There was a tie between Albert and Rocío in the Mortals tribe and Jorge as leader broke it nominating Rocío.
: As the leaders of the tribes, Alejandro and Jorge were given the power to name a nominee.
: Ferre was exempt as he was the God of the week. He also chose the leader of the Servants tribe.
: As the leaders of the tribes, Ivana and Jorge were given the power to name a nominee.
: Albert was exempt as he was the God of the week. He also chose the leader of the Servants tribe.
: There was a tie between all the contestants in the Servants tribe and Rocío as leader broke it nominating Fani.
: As the leaders of the tribes, Ferre and Rocío were given the power to name a nominee.
: Jose Antonio was exempt as he was the God of the week. He also chose the leader of the Servants tribe.
: As the leaders of the tribes, Elena and Rocío were given the power to name a nominee.
: Since this week, all the contestants were unificated in the same tribe called "Forbidden Beach".
: As the leader of the tribe, Albert was given the power to name a nominee.
: There was a tie between Fani and Ferre and Albert as leader broke it nominating Fani.
: Since this week, the Helpless beach tribe returned to the game as an usual tribe.
: Antonio was forced to be evacuated due to medical reasons, for this reason, the elimination was cancelled.
: As the leaders of the tribes, Albert and Nyno were given the power to name a nominee.
: Yiya was automatically nominated for offensive comments towards Rocío.
: As the leaders of the tribes, Jose Antonio and Nyno were given the power to name a nominee.
: All the contestants were reallocated in the tribes.
: Nyno and Rocío won one extra point in a challenge.
: As the leaders of the tribes, Ivana and Jorge were given the power to name a nominee.
: As the leaders of the tribes, Ivana and Yiya were given the power to name a nominee.
: All the remaining contestants merged into one tribe.
: There was a tie between Jorge and Rocío, Ivana as the leader had to break it nominating Jorge.
: As the leader of the tribe, Ivana was given the power to name a nominee.
: As the leader of the tribe, Elena was given the power to name a nominee.
: There was a tie between Elena, Hugo and Rocío, Albert as leader broke it nominating Hugo.
: As the leader of the tribe, Albert was given the power to name a nominee.
: There was a tie between Ana Mª and Jorge, Hugo as leader broke it nominating Jorge.
: As the leader of the tribe, Hugo was given the power to name a nominee.
: As the leader of the tribe, Ana Mª was given the power to name a nominee.
: Ana Mª won the last immunity challenge and went through the final vote. Jorge and Rocío were nominated.

Tribes

Ratings

"Galas"

"Conexión Honduras"

"Tierra de Nadie"

References

External links
 

Survivor Spain seasons
2020 Spanish television seasons